Sannaham is a 1985 Indian Malayalam film,  directed by Jose Kallen and produced by Aravind K. Varma. The film stars Prem Nazir, Ratheesh, Balan K. Nair and Madhuri in the lead roles. The film has musical score by Johnson.

Cast
Prem Nazir as Varma
Ratheesh as Ramesh
Balan K. Nair as Prathapan
Madhuri as Rekha 
Sumithra as Shaila
T. G. Ravi as Kaimal
Mala Aravindan as Neelakandan
Shivaji as Raghavan
Bobby Kottarakkara as Gopalakrishnan
Kuthiravattom Pappu as
Bheeman Raghu as Raghu
Rani Padmini as Rani
K. R. Savithri as Gouriyamma
 Jose Kottaram
 Gomathi
 Babu
 Sreekumar
 Sivan
Manohari
Aravind K. Varma

Soundtrack
The music was composed by Johnson and the lyrics were written by Devadas.

References

External links
 

1985 films
1980s Malayalam-language films